Herbert Frederick Scherer (December 21, 1929 – June 28, 2012) was an American basketball player who played two seasons in the National Basketball Association (NBA).

Scherer, a 6'10" center, played collegiately at Long Island University from 1946 to 1950.  He was drafted by the New York Knicks in the second round of the 1950 NBA draft (18th pick overall).  Scherer played for the Tri-Cities Blackhawks in the 1950–51 NBA season, averaging 3.4 points per game as a rookie.  The following season, he played for the New York Knicks, averaging 3.9 points per game.

Following his NBA career, Scherer started his own construction business.  He died on June 28, 2012 in his home in Roswell, Georgia.

References

1929 births
2012 deaths
American Basketball League (1925–1955) players
Basketball players from New Jersey
Centers (basketball)
LIU Brooklyn Blackbirds men's basketball players
New York Knicks draft picks
New York Knicks players
People from Maplewood, New Jersey
People from Roswell, Georgia
Tri-Cities Blackhawks players
Washington Capitols players
Sportspeople from Essex County, New Jersey
Sportspeople from Fulton County, Georgia
American men's basketball players